David Omashola Carew is a Sierra Leonean economist and politician. He is Sierra Leone's Minister of Trade and Industry. He had also served as Minister of Finance of Sierra Leone from September 2007 to February 2009. Before becoming Minister of Finance, Carew was the Managing Partner for KPMG-Sierra Leone and was responsible for delivering KPMG services to clients in The Gambia and Liberia.

Education and career
Carew was born in Freetown to Creole parents. He is a product of the Sierra Leone Grammar School, one of the best secondary schools in Sierra Leone.  Carew graduated from the University of Sierra Leone in 1979 with a bachelor's degree in Economics. He was sent to KPMG Nigeria the same year and he worked in Nigeria until 1986 when he returned as an Assistant Manager.

In Nigeria he qualified as a Chartered Accountant in 1982 and was sent to the northern Nigeriean city of Kano. In the north he worked as an Audit Supervisor and was in charge of all KPMG's clients in the banking and financial institutions industry. He was designated Training 'Manager’ for the three northern states in Nigeria, reporting to the Training Partner in Lagos.

On his return to Freetown, as Assistant Manager of KPMG he was Engagement Manager for 50% of the firm's clients, managing the provision of assurance, taxation and secretarial services. He also handled the sensitive and major clients and also all the International referral jobs in the country.

In 1989, David Carew was admitted to Partnership Status in KPMG-Sierra Leone and again in 1991, he was made a Partner in the KPMG-Gambia operations. During that time he was the Engagement Partner for all the firm's clients in Sierra Leone and the major and international referral client in the Gambia. During this period David set up the Management Consulting Services in Sierra Leone and The Gambia. He assisted the Senior Partner who was in charge of corporate finance work. He was also in charge of Forensic work with the Government of Sierra Leone as a major client.

Carew is married to a Creole and has two children.

Cabinet positions
Carew was appointed as Minister of Finance of Sierra Leone under President Ernest Bai Koroma. It was announced on 28 February 2009 that he was being moved to the position of Minister of Trade and Industry.

David Carew has held the office of Minister of Trade and Industry  in Sierra Leone since late April 2009.

References

External links
https://web.archive.org/web/20080112052054/http://news.sl/drwebsite/publish/article_20056720.shtml

Finance ministers of Sierra Leone
Sierra Leone Creole people
Living people
KPMG people
Sierra Leonean expatriates in Nigeria
Year of birth missing (living people)
Sierra Leonean economists